The Big Eight Conference Men's Basketball Player of the Year was an annual basketball award given to the Big Eight Conference's most outstanding player. The award was first given following the 1956–57 season and concluded after the 1995–96 season (the Big Eight disbanded and was re-formed into the present day Big 12 Conference). From 1960 through 1967 no award was given out. Wayman Tisdale of Oklahoma and Danny Manning of Kansas are the only players to have received the award three times. Manning was also the consensus National Player of the Year in 1988. Six other players won the award twice, last performed by Bryant Reeves of Oklahoma State (1993/95).

Missouri claimed the most winners with eight, followed by Kansas, Kansas State and Oklahoma with seven apiece.

Key

Winners

Winners by school

See also
Big 12 Conference Men's Basketball Player of the Year – the successor to the Big Eight Conference and its players of the year (although the Big 12 does not recognize Big Eight Players of the Year as their own)

References

NCAA Division I men's basketball conference players of the year
Player Of The Year
Awards disestablished in 1996
Awards established in 1957